The Trollfjord or Trollfjorden is a fjord in Hadsel Municipality in Nordland county, Norway. The fjord has a narrow entrance and steep-sided mountains surrounding it. The name is derived from troll, a figure from Norse mythology.

The fjord is a popular tourist attraction due to the beauty of its natural setting. It is only accessible by boat or by a nearby  hike over very rugged terrain. The Hurtigruten's ships on the route between Bergen and Kirkenes detour into Trollfjorden. It is also popular with other cruise lines.

Geography

Prior to 1960, there was a waterfall at the end of Trollfjorden, but it was redirected to produce hydroelectricity at a nearby power station.

Controversy
The location of the fjord is a bit of a local controversy. In 2016, the movie Downsizing was filmed in the Trollfjord and it was advertised and discussed in the media as having been filmed in Lofoten, a traditional region of Norway.  This, however, upset some in the neighboring traditional region of Vesterålen who claim the fjord as part of their region as well.  Both sides claim to be right.  The fjord is located on Austvågøya island (which is often considered part of Lofoten), but it is also in Hadsel Municipality (which is often considered part of Vesterålen).

History

The Battle of Trollfjord
The Battle of Trollfjord was fought in 1890 between the first industrial, steam-driven fishing ships and teams of traditional open-boat fishermen over access to the fjord. Johan Bojer described the battle in his 1921 novel The last of the Vikings.

A painting by Gunnar Berg, Trollfjordslaget depicts The Battle at Trollfjord. The painting is currently located in the Art Galleri Gunnar Berg on the island Svinøya in Svolvær town.

Sailing into the Mousehole
In 1969 the TS Avalon, a British Rail ferry/cruise ship, sailed into the Trollfjord, nicknamed the Mousehole by Capt William Bramhill, the ship's master. It then turned 180 degrees and came out. The captain said the experience meant he "nearly gave birth to kittens". On his 1971 cruise Bramhill was relieved not to have to repeat the feat – all vessels were barred because of the danger of falling snow, ice and rocks. The Norwegian pilot, the same man as in 1969, remarked that the Avalon had the distinction of being the largest vessel to enter the fjord. 

Avalon was 6,584GRT and 113m long; she carried 750 passengers in her role as a ferry but fewer on cruises. It is likely that the "largest ship" record is now held by the MS Otto Sverdrup  (formerly MS Finnmarken) which is 15,690GRT and 138.5m long.

Media gallery

References 

Fjords of Nordland
Tourist attractions in Nordland
Hadsel